The Mitchell Library is a large public library and centre of the City Council public library system of Glasgow, Scotland.

History
The library, based in the Charing Cross district, was initially established in Ingram Street in 1877 following a bequest from Stephen Mitchell, a wealthy tobacco producer, whose company, Stephen Mitchell & Son, would become one of the constituent members of the Imperial Tobacco Company. Part of the original collection came from a purchase in 1874 by Glasgow Corporation of 1800 early books gifted to the University of Glasgow from the Glasgow philanthropist William Euing.

New buildings were erected in North Street. A foundation stone was laid by Andrew Carnegie in September 1907. The completed building was opened by Lord Rosebery on 16 October 1911.

The library contains a large public library, with approximately 1,213,000 volumes. While composed mainly of reference material it also has a substantial lending facility which began in 2005. The North Street building, with its distinctive copper dome surmounted by Thomas Clapperton's bronze statue entitled Literature (often referred to as Minerva, the Roman goddess of wisdom) opened in 1911. The architectural competition for the library was held in 1906 and was won by William B. Whitie. The Edwardian Baroque building is protected as a category B listed building.

The vast majority of the library's collection however is housed in the Extension Building, which was built between 1972 and 1980. Located to the west of the original building it occupies the site of the St Andrew's Halls, which were designed by James Sellars, and opened in 1877. Acquired by Glasgow Corporation in 1890 it was Scotland`s pre-eminent venue for concerts and meetings. It had a large and striking classical facade and included a Grand Hall which could hold 4,500 people, two Lesser Halls, further small halls and a large ballroom. The building was gutted by fire on 26 October 1962, although the facade survived and was later incorporated into the 1980 extension of the Mitchell Library, with the principal entrance now being in Granville Street.

People 

 Francis Thornton Barrett (1838 - 1919), first librarian of The Mitchell Library between 1877 & 1899, and city librarian for Glasgow between 1901 & 1914.

 Septimus Pitt (1877 - 1937), city librarian for Glasgow between 1915 - 1937.

Services
As part of a major internal refurbishment in 2005, the ground floor of the extension was recreated as an internal street running east to west. A new café bar was incorporated with a large learning centre providing free internet and Wi-Fi services. A new business lounge and a lending library have also been created.

Containing five floors, access is freely open to the public, whether library borrowing members or non-members. Non-members can, upon request, use PCs and the internet as well as printed reference materials.

The Mitchell Library also holds the Glasgow City Archives and Special Collections which are considered to be one of the world's best resources for researching family history and are much used in the television series Who Do You Think You Are?.

The Mitchell is also a venue centre offering the hire and use of the Edwardian Hall, linked rooms in the North Street building, Mitchell Theatre and breakout rooms in the Granville Street extension, for conferences, banquets, exhibitions and meetings.

Mitchell Theatre
The 1980 extension building incorporates the 418-seat Mitchell Theatre. The venue hosts a variety of theatre, music and spoken word events, including some during Glasgow's Celtic Connections and Aye Write! festivals.

Gallery

References

External links

Virtual Mitchell The Mitchell's digital archive resource.
Council Page describing the Mitchell.
Online Catalogue

Public libraries in Scotland
Edwardian architecture
Category B listed buildings in Glasgow
Listed library buildings in Scotland
Libraries in Glasgow
Library buildings completed in 1911
Library buildings completed in 1980
1911 establishments in Scotland
John Cunningham buildings
Domes